Attack of the Giant Leeches (originally to be called The Giant Leeches) is an independently made, 1959 black-and-white science fiction-horror film, produced by Gene Corman and directed by Bernard L. Kowalski. It stars Ken Clark, Yvette Vickers, Bruno VeSota and Jan Shepard. The screenplay was written by Leo Gordon. The film was released by American International Pictures on a double bill with A Bucket of Blood. Later, in some areas in 1960, Leeches played on a double bill with the Roger Corman film House of Usher.

Attack of the Giant Leeches was one of a spate of "creature features" produced during the 1950s in response to Cold War fears; a character in the film speculates that the leeches have been mutated to giant size by atomic radiation from nearby Cape Canaveral.

Plot
In the Florida Everglades, a pair of larger-than-human, intelligent leeches live in an underwater cave. They begin dragging locals down to their cave, where they slowly feed on them, draining their victims of blood. Two of the first victims of the leeches are local vixen Liz Walker (Vickers), who has been cheating on her husband (Bruno VeSota), and Liz's latest paramour. Game warden Steve Benton (Clark) sets out to investigate their disappearance. Aided by his girlfriend, Nan Grayson (Sheppard), and her father, Doc Grayson, Benton discovers the leeches' underwater cavern. The creatures are destroyed when Steve, Doc and several state troopers blow up their underwater cavern using dynamite. However, in the film's closing moments the leeches distinctive sucking sounds are heard, suggesting they may still be alive.

Cast 
Ken Clark as Steve Benton
Yvette Vickers as Liz Walker
Jan Shepard as Nan Greyson
Michael Emmet as Cal Moulton
Tyler McVey as Doc Greyson
Bruno VeSota as Dave Walker
Gene Roth as Sheriff Kovis
Dan White as Porky Reed
George Cisar as Lem Sawyer
Joseph Hamilton as Old Sam Peters
Walter Kelley as Mike
Guy Buccola as Giant Leech #1
Ross Sturlin as Giant Leech #2

Production
The film was shot over eight days, including outdoor sequences at the Los Angeles County Arboretum and Botanic Garden. During filming, Gene Corman came down with pneumonia and wound up in the hospital.

Actress Yvette Vickers had appeared as the Playmate centerfold in the July 1959 issue of Playboy magazine, several months prior to the film's release. 

Producers Roger and Gene Corman begged special effects artist Paul Blaisdell to create the leech costumes for the film, but Blaisdell said the effects budget was so minute, it wouldn't have even covered the cost of the materials he would need to make the creature suits. The costumes were eventually designed by actor Ed Nelson and Gene Corman's wife, each contributing ideas. Some reference sources say the monster suits were constructed from black raincoats that were stitched together, while others say black plastic garbage bags were used.

Attack of the Giant Leeches is now in the public domain; its copyright was never renewed.

Reception

Attack of the Giant Leeches holds a 70% approval rating on review aggregation website Rotten Tomatoes, based on 10 reviews; the average rating is 5.06/10.  Film critic Leonard Maltin awarded the film 1.5 out of 4 stars, calling it a "ludicrous hybrid of white trash and monster genres".

Remake
A remake of the film, directed by Brett Kelly and written by Jeff O'Brien, was released on July 7, 2008.

A stage adaptation of the original was performed at The Village Theatre in Atlanta, Georgia in February 2020.

Legacy
In July 1992, Attack of the Giant Leeches was featured as a fourth-season episode of the film-mocking television series Mystery Science Theater 3000. It was also featured on the nationally syndicated horror host television show Cinema Insomnia, and in the second episode of season 5 of Shilling Shockers, a New England-based television show hosted by the witch Penny Dreadful XIII.

Home media
Being in the public domain, Attack of the Giant Leeches has received numerous bargain bin DVD releases. The MST3K version of the film was released on October 26, 2004 by Rhino Home Video as part of a box set, The Mystery Science Theater 3000 Collection: Volume 6. Cheapskate Theater released an HD download of the film on June 7, 2016, featuring a new introduction by Toby Radloff and Radloff outtakes and bloopers.

See also
 List of films in the public domain in the United States

References

External links

 
 
 
 
 

1959 independent films
1950s monster movies
1950s science fiction horror films
1959 films
1959 horror films
American black-and-white films
American International Pictures films
American monster movies
American independent films
American science fiction horror films
Articles containing video clips
1950s English-language films
Giant monster films
Films directed by Bernard L. Kowalski
Films produced by Gene Corman
Films produced by Roger Corman
Films set in Florida
Films shot in New Orleans
American natural horror films
American exploitation films
1950s American films